Datnioides is a genus of fish known commonly as tigerfish, tiger perch or freshwater tripletails, but all of these common names are also used for other families. It is the only genus in the family Datnioididae. These fish are found in fresh and brackish waters of rivers,  estuaries and coastal areas in South and Southeast Asia, and New Guinea.

Some researchers suggest that this family is related to the tripletails, family Lobotidae, while others do not find enough evidence to make the suggestion. The two families share an apparently unique mode of tooth replacement, a trait which might be a synapomorphy.

Characteristics 
Datnioides have a total of 24 vertebrae. The dorsal fin has a hard-rayed portion with 12 fin rays, and a soft-rayed portion with 15 to 16 fin rays. Along with the anal fin, which sits towards the rear of the fish, and the round caudal fin, these fins give the appearance of three caudal fins. The ploughshare bone and palatine bone in Datnioides fish are toothless. There are five species of Datnioides that can grow to be 30 to 45 centimeters in length. These fish are predatory and feed on small fish.

Systematics 
The Dutch ichthyologist Pieter Bleeker first introduced the genus Datnioides in 1853. In most classifications, these fish are placed in their own family, called Datnioididae. The genera Lobotes and Hapalogenys, which was formerly often placed in the family Haemulidae, are closely related to Datnioides. In the standard work on fish systematics, "Fishes of the World" by Joseph S. Nelson, Datnioides and Lobotes are placed in the family Lobotidae, which was introduced by U.S. ichthyologist Theodore Nicholas Gill in 1861. Gill also introduced the genus Datnioides in 1861.

Species
The currently recognized species in this genus are:

 Datnioides campbelli Whitley, 1939 – New Guinea tiger perch
 Datnioides microlepis Bleeker, 1854 – finescale tigerfish, Indonesian tigerfish
 Datnioides polota (F. Hamilton, 1822) – silver tigerfish
 Datnioides pulcher (Kottelat, 1998) – Siamese tiger perch, Siamese tigerfish
 Datnioides undecimradiatus (T. R. Roberts & Kottelat, 1994) – Mekong tiger perch

References

External links

 Secrets of the Datnoids Tigerfish. datnoidstigerfish.org

Perciformes genera
Percoidei